D.G. Kerr was a lake freighter, launched in 1916, for the Pittsburg Steamship Company.  Ownership was transferred to US Steel, in 1952.
She is considered to be a "600 footer", a vessel whose design was based on the J. Pierpont Morgan, built in 1903.

In 1921 the DG Kerr set a record, loading her entire capacity of 12,507 tons of ore, in just 16 and a half minutes.

She ran aground in 1970, and was permanently laid up in 1975.
She was lost, off the Azores, while under tow to a Spanish ship breaker's yard.

Namesake

The vessel was named in honor of David Garret Kerr, a Vice President of U.S. Steel.

References

1916 ships
Great Lakes freighters
Ships built in Lorain, Ohio